Mark Anthony Osiecki (born July 23, 1968) is an American ice hockey coach and former professional ice hockey player. Osiecki was the head coach of the Ohio State University ice hockey team from the 2010–11 season to the 2012–13 season. Osiecki played 93 games in the NHL for the Calgary Flames, Ottawa Senators, Winnipeg Jets and Minnesota North Stars. Osiecki was drafted by the Flames in the 9th round, 187th overall in the 1987 NHL Entry Draft.

Osiecki represented the United States at the 1992 World Hockey Championships, recording one assist in six games.

Following his retirement as a player in 1995, Osiecki spent seven seasons as the head coach and general manager of the Green Bay Gamblers of the United States Hockey League, leading the team to a Clark Cup championship in 2000.  He then spent the next six seasons as assistant coach under Mike Eaves at his alma mater, the University of Wisconsin, winning the national championship in 2006.  Osiecki then left to pursue a head coaching position at Ohio State.

In 2016 Osiecki was hired as an assistant coach with the Wisconsin Badgers men's ice hockey team following a stint with the Rockford IceHogs.

Career statistics

Head coaching record

Junior

College

Awards and honors

References

External links

1968 births
Living people
American men's ice hockey defensemen
Calgary Flames draft picks
Calgary Flames players
Detroit Vipers players
Ice hockey coaches from Minnesota
Kalamazoo Wings (1974–2000) players
Minnesota North Stars players
Minnesota Moose players
NCAA men's ice hockey national champions
New Haven Senators players
Ohio State Buckeyes men's ice hockey coaches
Ottawa Senators players
People from Burnsville, Minnesota
Salt Lake Golden Eagles (IHL) players
Winnipeg Jets (1979–1996) players
Wisconsin Badgers men's ice hockey players
Wisconsin Badgers men's ice hockey coaches
Ice hockey players from Minnesota